The Akitkan Range is a mountain range in Irkutsk Oblast and Buryatia, Russian Federation.

The Paleoproterozoic Akitkan Orogen is named after the range.

History
Between 1855 and 1858 Ivan Kryzhin (d. 1884) took part in the Eastern Siberian expedition led by Russian astronomer and traveler Ludwig Schwarz. In 1857 he mapped the Kirenga River and, while exploring its right tributary, the Cherepanikha, Kryzhin discovered the formerly unknown Akitkan Range rising above the area of its source.  

The North Baikal Highlands, where the range rises, were explored between 1909 and 1911 by Russian geologist Pavel Preobrazhensky (1874 - 1944). He surveyed the river valley of the Chechuy, a right tributary of the Lena with its sources in the Akitkan. 
Overcoming numerous difficulties, Preobrazhensky managed to map for the first time a  stretch of the Akitkan Range.

Geography
It is limited by the Cis-Baikal Depression (предбайкальская впадина) to the west, the Lena to the north and the Chaya river valley to the east. To the southeast rises the Synnyr.

Hydrography
The Chechuy, a Lena tributary, as well as numerous tributaries of the Kirenga, such as the Minya, Okunayka and Kutima, have their sources in the range.

Akitkan Orogen
The Akitkan Orogen forms a suture between the Anabar Shield to the northwest and the Aldan Shield to the southeast. It is a feature of the Siberian Craton known only from geophysical data along most of its extent because it is covered by younger rocks.

See also
List of mountains and hills of Russia

References

External links
Metallogeny of Northern, Central and Eastern Asia (Explanatory Note to the Metallogenic map of Northern–Central–Eastern Asia and Adjacent Areas at scale 1:2,500,000), St. Petersburg 2017

Mountain ranges of Russia
Mountains of Irkutsk Oblast
Mountains of Buryatia
South Siberian Mountains